Álvaro Felipe Césped Lártiga (born October 10, 1991), is a Chilean footballer currently playing for Unión San Felipe of the Primera B de Chile.

Honors

Club
San Luis de Quillota
 Primera B de Chile (2): 2013 Apertura, 2014–15

External links
 
 

1991 births
Living people
People from Quillota
Chilean footballers
Chilean expatriate footballers
San Luis de Quillota footballers
Gimnasia y Esgrima de Jujuy footballers
Unión La Calera footballers
Cobreloa footballers
Unión San Felipe footballers
Chilean Primera División players
Primera B de Chile players
Primera Nacional players
Chilean expatriate sportspeople in Argentina
Expatriate footballers in Argentina
Association football midfielders